Seza is a rural locality (a settlement) in Fedovskoye Rural Settlement of Plesetsky District, Arkhangelsk Oblast, Russia. The population was 83 as of 2010. There are 4 streets.

Geography 
Seza is located 99 km southwest of Plesetsk (the district's administrative centre) by road. Kurlayevskaya is the nearest rural locality.

References 

Rural localities in Plesetsky District